Teodora Sava (born November 27, 2001, Piatra Neamț) is a singer, former Antena 1 television channel star, and former contestant on the international music talent competition X Factor Romania.

Biography 
Teodora Sava was born on November 27, 2001 in Piatra Neamț. She was a student at Victor Brauner High School of Fine Arts in Piatra Neamț and at George Enescu National College of Music in Bucharest, studying singing, playing the piano, flute and guitar. She currently studies at BIMM Institute in London, UK. She does not see herself doing anything else besides music, which defines her. She also took acting lessons and made her acting debut in May 2017 at a theater festival in Suceava for young people and children, where she came out first, continuing afterwards with parts in plays such as the teen musical "If We Love Each Other".

She attended cultural activities and concerts as well as events for young people. According to her own statements, she "sang at charity concerts, abandoned children's homes and old age asylums", she loves nature and animals, and most of all she loves to engage in the lives of others, including through volunteering. She also dreams of singing one day on stage with Beyoncé, Christina Aguilera or Mariah Carey, and she wants to study music abroad.

She sang in duets together with Nico, Paula Seling and the band "Proconsul" at the TV show Next Star and on stage, and the band "FREE STAY" (whose lead singer is Florin Ristei) at the TV show Te cunosc de undeva!.

Her artistic performances since childhood, and performing on the television music talent show X Factor Romania 2017 – Season 7, persuaded the Local Council of Piatra Neamț to invite and give her an award in the presence of the local councilors and town mayor. She was also nominated as Ambassador of Neamț County to the "Young Values" category within the "Gala of the Neamț Ambassadors" and since 2017 she has been a member of the Local Youth Council of Piatra Neamț.

Early life and education 
Teodora Sava was noted for her vocal qualities since kindergarten, being supported at that time by Oana Floricel. "Sister Monica, a nun responsible for the children at the Vincenzina Cusmano Foundation kindergarten, noticed that our little girl had a special voice. She composed and recorded her first songs", according to Mihai Sava, the artist's father. The four songs were recorded and published in 4 CDs for children with different themes. The collaboration with Professor Alina Apetrei at Allegria Club followed, where Teodora was a member. Since November 2009 she has trained with Professor Cristina Cozma from the Children's Palace in Iași and Professor Lucian Sitaru from the Arts High School in Piatra Neamț, the coordinator of the "Camena" group, with whom Teodora won the Special Prize of TVR for the best show at "Mamaia Copiilor" and 2nd place at the Junior Golden Stag Festival, both in 2010. The first prize won was the 3rd place at the "Fiero" National Children's Music Festival, held in Bucharest in January 2010. The invitation to sing at the "Junior Golden Stag Festival" contest followed, also in 2010. "In front of the audience, Mihai Trăistariu, who was president of the judging panel, admitted that he was impressed by the way Teodora sang and awarded her the "Revelation of the Festival" prize. Also, composer Dan Dimitriu invited her to perform a few songs at this year's (2010) Junior Golden Stag competition", according to Mihaela Sava, the singer's mother.

Musical and vocal performances 

Her cover songs performed at a very young age at the TV show for kids Next Star 2013 (Listen and One Moment in Time) had many positive reactions from people that were watching her for the first time. One of the judges, the hip hop and pop singer Connect-R, even invited her to sing at his own wedding. Right after that show, she took the offer of recording an original song, called "Belief". For years, while still a child, her songs reached a mature audience. The songs she performs are shown on her YouTube channel. Various Romanian musicians define Teodora Sava as having a constancy in the accurate and seemingly effortless performance of difficult songs with a powerful and well-controlled voice, a native ease of employing melodious melismas and high notes, a pleasant vibrato and a noteworthy vocal range. Thus, singer Pepe, judge of the Next Star show, said in a show that Teodora Sava was the best voice in all the Next Star seasons, Florin Ristei (winner of Season 3 of X Factor Romania) said that Teodora Sava was "the best guest of the 15 Te cunosc de undeva! gala shows so far" and artist Ozana Barabancea told her after her duet in the previously mentioned show: "I applaud Teodora with all my heart. I know your record. You have an extraordinary and very well launched voice, very well supported, because you are flutist at Piatra-Neamţ High School of Arts, so you are a professional musician. That matters a lot, and for those who do not know, breathing for a flute player is what matters most and, even more, it has helped you support your entire musical phrase and approach such a difficult repertoire, because you have acquired very good skills." In season 7 of X Factor Romania 2017, the judges (well-known singers in Romania themselves) repeatedly expressed words (related to her performances) such as "wall","panzer","robot","little robot", "a fifteen-year-old girl who sings her heart out", "you were impeccable", "the best voice by far", "you are the nuisance that motivates all the contestants from behind", "a German battle tank that does its job relentlessly", to emphasize her accurate performance constancy at high artistic standards in each stage of the contest, regardless of the obstacles and ever present stage fright when taking the stage.

Television shows 

 X Factor (Romania) 2017 (season 7)
 TV show 'Neatza cu Răzvan și Dani (Antena 1 Romania)
 Antena 1 –  Next Star: Season 1 – 2013 (runner-up), plus in other Special Editions that followed
 Antena 3 (Romania): Sinteza zilei
 Antena Stars: Răi da' buni
 Antena 1: Junior Chef
 Antena 1: Te cunosc de undeva!
 ZU TV: ZU Kids On the Block
 Național TV; Favorit TV; EST TV; Antena 1 Deva
 Several performances at TVR 3 in the show Țara lui Piticot
 Shows for kids at local TV stations from Piatra Neamț (TVM, 1TV, TeleM)
 Charity show "For you, children", held at Teatrul Tineretului Piatra Neamț in December 2009

Awards and nominations 
Teodora Sava achieved many awards and trophies. In 2010–2012, the artist participated in about 40 festivals and contests, to get acquainted with the stage and to get used to the competitions, and for her voice development:

 Festival Liga Campionilor, Râșnov, July 2013 – place I
 Festival Trofeul Toamnei, Piatra Neamț, November 2012 – Trophy
 Festival Stea printre Stele, Bacău, November 2012 – place I Grand prize "Mihai Trăistariu”
 Festival Constelația Juniorilor, Focșani, October 2012 – place I
 Festival Așchiuță, Bacău, June 2012 – Trophy
 Festival Cununa Petrolului, Moreni, Dâmbovița June 2012 – Trophy gr. 1
 Festival Vis de Stea, Moinești, June 2012 – Trophy
 Festival Mihaela Runceanu, Buzău, May 2012 – Trophy
 Festival Lucky Kids, Roman, April 2012 – Trophy
 Festival Femina, Bacău, 2012 – Trophy
 Festival Adantino Bucharest, 2011 – Trophy
 Festival Neghiniță Bacău, 2011 – Trophy
 Festival Cântec de Stea, Piatra Neamț, 2011 – place I
 Festival Music For Kids, Iași, 2011 – Kids Trophy
 Contest "Galeria Mall is looking for a star", Piatra Neamț, 2011 – place I
 Festival Farmecul muzicii, Năvodari, 2011 – Trophy gr. 1
 Festival Mamaia Copiilor, Constanța, 2011 – Press Award
 Festival Junior Golden Stag (Romanian Top Kids)", Bucharest, 2011 – Diploma
 Festival Music For Kids, Iași, June 2011 – place I category 8–10 years old
 Festival Portativul cu Steluțe, Ploiești, March 2011 – Trophy
 Festival Fulg de nea, Brașov, November 2010 – place I
 Festival Trofeul Toamnei, Piatra Neamț, November 2010 – place I
 Contest "Galeria Mall is looking for a star", Piatra Neamț, September 2010 – place I
 Festival Olimpiada copiilor, Bacău, May 2010 – place I
 Festival Liga Campionilor, Râșnov, August 2010 – Trophy category 8–10 years old
 Festival Camena, Piatra Neamț, June 2010 – Trophy category 5–8 years old
 Festival Trofeul Toamnei, Piatra Neamț, 2010 – Press Award
 Festival Steluțe de Mai, Focșani, 2010 –  Melody Award
 Festival Camena, Piatra Neamț, 2010 – "Revelation of the Festival" award (Mihai Trăistariu)
 Microconcert within the Festival "Junior Golden Stag" 2010

Songs performed including cover songs 

 2021  Never Enough – music and lyrics by Teodora Sava
 2021  First – music and lyrics by Teodora Sava
 2017  Alive – X Factor Romania 2017, season 7 – second of the final shows (live, second round); eliminated
 2017  Listen – X Factor Romania 2017, season 7 – second of the final shows (live, first round); advanced to the next round
 2017  Purple Rain – X Factor Romania 2017, season 7 – first of the final shows (recorded); passed to the next stage
 2017  The Voice Within – X Factor Romania 2017, season 7 – The Duels; passed to the next stage
 2017  Firework – X Factor Romania 2017, season 7 – Four-chair challenge (Bootcamp); passed to the next stage
 2017  Who's Lovin' You – X Factor Romania 2017, season 7 – Judges' auditions; passed to the next stage with 4 answers of "yes"
 2017  The Greatest
 2017  Nobody's Perfect – duet with Free Stay
 2016  Stone Cold
 2016  Take Me to Church
 2016  Lost on You
 2015  Roar
 2015  Halo
 2015  I Don't Want to Miss a Thing
 2015  If I Were a Boy
 2015  When You Believe – duet with Nico
 2014  La solitudine – duet with Paula Seling
 2014  I Was Here
 2014  All I Want for Christmas Is You

References

External links
 Teodora Sava – Official Site
 Teodora Sava interview (in Romanian)

2001 births
People from Piatra Neamț
Living people
Romanian women pop singers
21st-century Romanian singers
21st-century Romanian women singers